The Norwegian Second Division is the third highest level of women's football in Norway. In the 2022 season, it consisted of 71 teams divided into eight groups. Two teams are promoted to the Norwegian First Division each season. The worst ranked teams are relegated to the Norwegian Third Division. Fyllingsdalen and Grei are the current champions.

Starting from the 2023 season, the league will consist of 28 teams divided into two groups. Each group winner will be promoted, while the bottom three teams in each group will be relegated.

List of promoted teams

References

Notes

 
3
Third level women's association football leagues in Europe